The Scout and Guide movement in Senegal is served by
 Confédération Sénégalaise du Scoutisme, umbrella organisation, member of the World Organization of the Scout Movement
 Association des Scouts et Guides du Sénégal, also member of the World Association of Girl Guides and Girl Scouts
 Eclaireuses et Eclaireurs du Sénégal
 Scouts et guides musulmans du Sénégal

See also

References